H4 is a 2012 independent American film directed by Paul Quinn; actor Harry Lennix produced the film and stars in the title role. The film premiered at the 2012 Conference of the Shakespeare Association of America, and later showed premiere in competition at the 49th Chicago International Film Festival in 2013. In November 2014, the film was shown at the Indie Memphis Film Festival.

Plot 
The film is an adaptation that combines William Shakespeare's plays Henry IV, Part 1 and Henry IV, Part 2 and sets them in contemporary Los Angeles. The screenplay was adapted by Dr. Ayanna Thompson, Professor of English at Arizona State University, retaining Shakespeare's original language.  According to Lennix, the film is told "from the perspective of black people, acted primarily by black people, and it’s from the black point of view"; he nevertheless describes Shakespeare's themes, and the film's, as "universal".  Thompson describes the script as being "about the politics and political manoeuvring within the African-American community".

Production 
Post-production of the film was partly funded by a $25,000 Kickstarter campaign.

In August 2012, a rough cut of the film was previewed at the International Shakespeare Conference in Stratford-upon-Avon to international Shakespeare scholars.

The film was scheduled for release in US cinemas in 2015.

References

External links 
 
 H4 - the movie - completed Kickstarter campaign 

2012 films
2010s English-language films